Artur Dorsé (20 March 1920 – 7 May 2010) was a Spanish professional road bicycle racer, who competed as a professional between 1943 and 1949. He competed as an individual for his entire career.

Major results
1944
 1st Stage 7 Volta a Catalunya
1945
 1st Road race, Catalonia Independent Road Championships
 6th Overall Volta a Catalunya
1946
 6th Trofeo Jaumendreu
1949
 3rd Trofeo Jaumendreu
 5th Overall Vuelta a la Comunidad Valenciana

References

External links
 Artur Dorsé on sitiodeciclismo.net

1920 births
2010 deaths
Sportspeople from Granollers
Spanish male cyclists
Volta a Catalunya cyclists
Cyclists from Catalonia
20th-century Spanish people